The Billboard Tropical Albums chart, published in Billboard magazine, is a record chart that features Latin music sales information in regard to tropical music. The data is compiled by Nielsen SoundScan from a sample that includes music stores, music departments at electronics and department stores, Internet sales (both physical and digital) and verifiable sales from concert venues in the United States.

Number-one albums

References
General

 For information about every week of this chart, follow this link; in the chart date section select a date and the top ten positions for the week selected will appear on screen, including the number-one album, which is shown in the table above.

Specific

Tropical 2020s
United States Tropical Albums
2020s in Latin music
Tropical music albums